Kanampella East Grama Niladhari Division is a  Grama Niladhari Division of the  Seethawaka Divisional Secretariat  of Colombo District  of Western Province, Sri Lanka .  It has Grama Niladhari Division Code 425.

Kanampella East is a surrounded by the  Wedagama, Ranwala, Udakanampella South, Udugama, Senasungoda, Ihala Kosgama North, Kanampella West, Manakada, Miriswatta and Thawalgoda  Grama Niladhari Divisions.

Demographics

Ethnicity 

The Kanampella East Grama Niladhari Division has  a Sinhalese majority (85.6%) and a significant Sri Lankan Tamil population (10.2%) . In comparison, the Seethawaka Divisional Secretariat (which contains the Kanampella East Grama Niladhari Division) has  a Sinhalese majority (88.2%)

Religion 

The Kanampella East Grama Niladhari Division has  a Buddhist majority (84.4%) and a significant Hindu population (10.8%) . In comparison, the Seethawaka Divisional Secretariat (which contains the Kanampella East Grama Niladhari Division) has  a Buddhist majority (81.5%)

References 

Grama Niladhari Divisions of Seethawaka Divisional Secretariat